Maurice Perrin (26 October 1911 – 2 January 1992) was a French cyclist. He won a gold medal in the tandem event at the 1932 Summer Olympics.

References

External links
 

1911 births
1992 deaths
French male cyclists
Olympic cyclists of France
Cyclists at the 1932 Summer Olympics
Olympic gold medalists for France
Olympic medalists in cycling
Medalists at the 1932 Summer Olympics
Cyclists from Paris
French track cyclists